McGregor is an unincorporated community and census-designated place (CDP) in northeastern Williams County, North Dakota, United States. It lies along North Dakota Highway 40, northeast of the city of Williston, the county seat of Williams County. McGregor's elevation is 2,218 feet (676 m). Although unincorporated, it has a post office, with the ZIP code of 58755. It was first listed as a CDP prior to the 2020 census.

Demographics

Education
It is within the Tioga School District.

References

Unincorporated communities in Williams County, North Dakota
Unincorporated communities in North Dakota
Census-designated places in Williams County, North Dakota
Census-designated places in North Dakota